Mission Church can refer to:
 Mission church, in some Christian denominations, a church that does not have full status as a parish church, and is supported by an external organization, such as a parish or diocese
 Mission Church (Michigan), on Mackinac Island, built 1823
 Mission Church (Arctic Village, Alaska), built 1917
 Basilica and Shrine of Our Lady of Perpetual Help in Boston, built 1878, also known as the Mission Church
 Mission Covenant Church of Norway
 Mission Covenant Church of Sweden
 Mission churches, built by Spanish missions in the Americas

See also
 Christian mission